Koluchan or Koloochan or Kaluchan or Kaloochan or Keluchan may refer to:
 Koluchan, Bandar Abbas, Hormozgan Province
 Koluchan, Isfahan